Siti Syarifah (born Eva Yanthi Arnaz; 14 July 1958), better known as Eva Arnaz, is an Indonesian actress who was prominent in Indonesian film in the 1980s. She was best known for her work in action films.

Filmography

Primitif (1978)
Musim bercinta (1978)
Special Silencers (1979) as Julia
Lembah duka (1981)
Jaka Sembung (1981)
Warok singo kobra (1982)
Serbuan halilintar (1982)
Pasukan berani mati (1982)
Perempuan Bergairah (1982) as Bambi
Ferocious Female Freedom Fighters, Part 2 (1982) as Bambi
Pokoknya beres (1983)
Midah perawan buronan (1983)
Maju kena mundur kena (1983)
Five Deadly Angels (1983)
Membakar Matahari (1984)
Gadis bionic (1984)
Putri duyung (1985)
Noda X (1985)
Hell Raiders (1985)
Jaka Sembung & Bergola Ijo (1985)
Depan bisa belakang bisa (1987)
Cintaku di rumah susun (1987)
Barang terlarang (1987) as Rini
Suamiku sayang (1990) as  Tience
Lupa aturan main (1990)
Antri dong (1990)
Perawan metropolitan (1991) as Nurlela
Barang titipan (1991)
Asmara (1992)

External links 

1958 births
20th-century Indonesian actresses
Actors from West Sumatra
Indonesian film actresses
Living people
Minangkabau people